Pulley v. Harris, 465 U.S. 37 (1984), is a United States Supreme Court case in which the Court held that the Eighth Amendment to the United States Constitution does not require, as an invariable rule in every case, that a state appellate court, before it affirms a death sentence, proportionally compare the sentence in the case before it with the penalties imposed in similar cases if requested to do so by the prisoner.

The prisoner in the case, Robert Alton Harris, was ultimately executed in April 1992, after the U.S. Supreme Court reversed the Ninth Circuit several more times in the matter, including after Harris had been strapped into the gas chamber.

See also
 List of United States Supreme Court cases, volume 465

References

External links
 

United States Supreme Court cases
United States Supreme Court cases of the Burger Court
Cruel and Unusual Punishment Clause and death penalty case law
Capital punishment in California
1984 in United States case law